Criorhina fusca is a species of hoverfly in the family Syrphidae.

Distribution
United States.

References

Eristalinae
Insects described in 1964
Diptera of North America
Hoverflies of North America